Maurice Pope may refer to:

 Maurice Arthur Pope, Canadian diplomat
 Maurice Pope (linguist)